Seon, also spelled Sun, is an uncommon Korean family name, as well as an element in Korean given names. Its meaning differs based on the hanja used to write it.

Family name
As a family name, Seon may be written with either of two hanja, one meaning "to announce" and the other meaning "first". Each has one bon-gwan: for the former, Boseong, Jeollanam-do, and for the latter, Jinseong, Jinju, Gyeongsangnam-do, both in what is today South Korea. The 2000 South Korean census found 38,849 people with these family names. In a study by the National Institute of the Korean Language based on 2007 application data for South Korean passports, it was found that 60.7% of people with this surname spelled it in Latin letters as Sun in their passports, while another 39.2% spelled it as Seon.

People with this family name include:
Sun Dong-yeol (born 1963), South Korean baseball player
Sun Mi-sook (born 1968), South Korean volleyball player
Sun So-eun (born 1988), South Korean swimmer
Sun Yein (born 1996), stage name Sunyoul, South Korean singer, member of UP10TION
Sun Mu, 20th-century Korean painter
Sun Mi (born 1992), South Korean singer. Changed her name to Lee Sun-mi

Given name
There are 41 hanja with the reading "seon" on the South Korean government's official list of hanja which may be registered for use in given names; they are listed in the table at right.

People with the single-syllable name Seon include:
Seon of Balhae (fl. 818–830), 10th King of Balhae
Kim Seon (fl. 10th century), minor lord of the early Goryeo Dynasty
Jeong Seon (1676–1759), Joseon Dynasty landscape painter
Sunwoo Sun (born Jung Yoo-jin, 1975), South Korean actress
Chloe Kim (Korean name Kim Seon, born 2000), American snowboarder of Korean descent

Given names containing this element include:

First syllable
Sun-hee
Sun-hwa
Sun-mi
Seon-ok
Sun-woo
Sun-young

Second syllable
Ha-sun
Hee-sun
Jin-sun
Kwang-seon

Kyung-sun
Mi-sun
Min-sun
Nam-seon

See also
List of Korean given names

References

Korean-language surnames
Korean given names